Ash Tuesday (also known as Beyond the Ashes) is a 2003 comedy drama film directed by Jim Hershleder, written by Tony Spiridakis, and starring Janeane Garofalo, Giancarlo Esposito, and Tony Goldwyn. The film is an ensemble piece about several New Yorkers coping with the effects of the September 11 attacks, and was one of the first films to incorporate the events of 9/11 into its story.

The film had its world premiere at the 2003 Tribeca Festival.

Plot
The film is narrated by Punch, a cab driver who experiences an unexplained ringing in his head. Samantha, an introverted new transplant to New York, works at a dive bar where singer Gina Mascara provides the night’s entertainment. After Gina and Samantha get to know each other, they sleep together and begin a relationship. There is also homeless poet, Karl, who becomes drawn to Liz, a music critic who hasn’t left her apartment since she saw one of the planes crash into the Twin Towers.

Cast

Reception
In his review for eFilmCritic.com, Erik Childress wrote, "No one is ever going to mistake Ash Tuesday with the deep subtext inherent in 25th Hour, but it still co-exists as a nice ensemble piece that takes on considerable more depth once all the dots take connection. Spiridakis succeeds by not revealing all his cards too soon nor even by the film's end as it will take a few keen observations to see how the parallel paths all come to intersect." Of the cast, Childress opined, "Garofalo and Esposito somehow find a way through the clowniness to create sympathetic portraits of people who may be relying on excuses to govern their behavior", and "Jennifer Carpenter (in her film debut) does a nice job in conveying the secrets of a soul on a journey with no clear destination. The way she handles the brash Gina in her revelatory moments of truth are standout highlights."

Ronnie Scheib of Variety reviewed the film negatively, writing it "feels like an existential play poorly adapted for the screen." He added, "Only Giancarlo Esposito’s role — that of a down-and-out street poet extravagantly smitten with Janeane Garofalo’s spinsterish shut-in — dovetails with helmer Jim Hershleder’s hyper-real approach."

Home media
The film was released on DVD by Vanguard Cinema on August 30, 2005.

References

External links
 Ash Tuesday in the Internet Movie Database
 

2003 films
2003 comedy-drama films
2003 independent films
2003 LGBT-related films
2000s English-language films
American independent films
American LGBT-related films
Lesbian-related films
Hyperlink films
Films about homelessness
Films based on the September 11 attacks
Films set in New York City
Films shot in New York City
2000s American films